Twisted Metal: Head-On is a vehicular combat video game developed by Incognito Entertainment and published by Sony Computer Entertainment on March 24, 2005 for the PlayStation Portable and February 5, 2008 for the PlayStation 2. Santa Monica Studio assisted on development for both titles. Head-On was the seventh game released in the Twisted Metal series, and the first game in the series to ship fully online-enabled.

Head-On is a direct sequel to Twisted Metal 2, while ignoring the events of Twisted Metal III and Twisted Metal 4 and other installments. Akin to other games in the series, Head-On revolves around the same theme of a man named Calypso holding a vehicular combat tournament called "Twisted Metal", with the promise of granting the winner whatever they ask for.

PlayStation 2 port

A PlayStation 2 port of Twisted Metal: Head-On was released on February 5, 2008. The game was developed by Jaffe's newly formed studio Eat Sleep Play and was retitled Twisted Metal Head-On: Extra Twisted Edition. It was never released outside of North America and is thus only available in NTSC format.

The PS2 port contains extra features and bonuses, such as the unreleased live action end movies from Twisted Metal, a behind the scenes documentary and a concept art book. Each physical copy also comes with a code to download a Twisted Metal soundtrack. The documentary includes an answer to a question Twisted Metal fans have been asking for a long time. After fans deciphered a message in the Dark Past documentary as reading "Twisted Metal is coming on psthree", Jaffe confirmed it himself. It also lacks the online play feature of the original PSP version.

Minigames
Head-On also includes minigames that players can access via teleporters, which can be found in each level during Story Mode. These are bonus levels where players must collect power ups while circumventing obstacles that require a variety of tactics, including destroying taxicabs, jumping over chasms, and destroying helicopters using napalm bombs. The catch is that most of these minigames are timed, forcing the player to think on their feet, as it were, while maintaining a balance of caution and risk. Reaching the end of the mini-game prior to the timer's ending allows the player to all their powerups. Several characters can only be unlocked by completing the minigames on certain levels.

Reception

The game was met with average to positive reviews upon release. GameRankings and Metacritic gave it a score of 78.84% and 79 out of 100 for the PSP version, and 73.16% and 73 out of 100 for the PlayStation 2 version.

Notes

References

External links
 
 

2005 video games
Incognito Entertainment games
Multiplayer and single-player video games
PlayStation 2 games
PlayStation Portable games
Santa Monica Studio games
Sony Interactive Entertainment games
Twisted Metal
Vehicular combat games
Video games developed in the United States
Video games scored by Inon Zur
Video games set in 2007
Video games set in Egypt
Video games set in Greece
Video games set in Los Angeles
Video games set in Monaco
Video games set in Paris
Video games set in Romania
Video games set in Rome
Video games set in Russia
Video games set in Tokyo
Eat Sleep Play games